Choi Su-min (born 9 January 1990) is a South Korean handball player for Seoul City and the South Korean Republic national team.

References

1990 births
Living people
South Korean female handball players
Korea National Sport University alumni
Handball players at the 2016 Summer Olympics
Olympic handball players of South Korea
Handball players at the 2014 Asian Games
Handball players at the 2018 Asian Games
Asian Games gold medalists for South Korea
Asian Games medalists in handball
Medalists at the 2014 Asian Games
Medalists at the 2018 Asian Games
Universiade medalists in handball
Universiade silver medalists for South Korea
Medalists at the 2015 Summer Universiade
Handball players at the 2020 Summer Olympics